Jir Gavabar (also Romanized as Jīr Gavābar; also known as Jirgaver) is a village in Ahandan Rural District, in the Central District of Lahijan County, Gilan Province, Iran. At the 2006 census, its population was 90, in 27 families.

References 

Populated places in Lahijan County